Nerola was an inland town of ancient Bithynia inhabited during Roman times. Its name does not occur in ancient authors, but is inferred from epigraphic and other evidence.

Its site is located near Karakadılar in Asiatic Turkey.

References

Populated places in Bithynia
Former populated places in Turkey
History of Kocaeli Province
Roman towns and cities in Turkey